Lophotavia pulcherrima is a moth of the family Erebidae first described by William Jacob Holland in 1894.

Distribution
It is found in Gabon, Ghana, Sierra Leone and Zambia.

References

Calpinae